Crocus tournefortii, the Tournefort crocus,  is a species of flowering plant in the iris family Iridaceae, from South Greece and Northern Crete.

It has gained the Royal Horticultural Society's Award of Garden Merit.

References

External links
 
 

tournefortii